The Philadelphia crime family, also known as the Philadelphia Mafia, the Philly Mob  or Philly Mafia,  the Philadelphia-South Jersey Mafia, or Bruno-Scarfo family is an Italian-American Mafia family based in Philadelphia, Pennsylvania. Formed and based in South Philadelphia, the criminal organization primarily operates in various areas and neighborhoods in Philadelphia, the Greater Philadelphia Metropolitan Area (i.e. the Delaware Valley) and New Jersey, especially South Jersey. The family is notorious for its violence, due in particular to its succession of violent bosses and multiple mob wars.

As the Bruno crime family under the 20-year reign of boss Angelo Bruno (1959–1980), the family enjoyed an era of peace and prosperity. A complex dispute involving disgruntled subordinates and territory claims by New York's Genovese crime family led to Bruno's murder in 1980. The killing marked the beginning of years of internal violence for control of the Philadelphia family, leading to a gradual decline in the family's stability.

Bruno's death led to an internal war for control of the crime family. Bruno was succeeded as boss by his loyal friend, Philip "The Chicken Man" Testa; however, within a year of Bruno's murder, Testa was also murdered, killed in a nail bomb explosion in 1981. When the dust settled from Bruno and Testa's deaths, Nicodemo "Little Nicky" Scarfo emerged as boss of the crime family. During Scarfo's reign, the family was known as the Scarfo crime family. Scarfo's 10-year reign saw the family grow in power, but also become highly dysfunctional. Unlike Bruno, Scarfo was infamous for his short temper and penchant for violence. Scarfo increasingly involved the family in narcotics trafficking and demanded that all criminals pay a street tax for operating in his territory. Scarfo also did not hesitate to order people murdered over moderate disputes. The dramatic rise in violence attracted increased attention from the FBI, Pennsylvania State Police and New Jersey State Police. Increased violence and law enforcement prosecutions also convinced several mobsters to cooperate with the government in order to escape death or prison. Scarfo's downfall came in 1988, when he and most of his top allies were arrested and sentenced to long prison terms.

With Scarfo's imprisonment, the Mafia hierarchy was convinced that Scarfo was unfit for the position of boss. Once Scarfo was deposed due to rising tensions within the family, John Stanfa was named boss of the Philadelphia family in 1991. However, a faction of young mobsters led by Joey Merlino disputed Stanfa's ascension, and by 1992 another war within the family was underway.  The war ended in 1994, when Stanfa and most of his supporters were arrested by the FBI, though internecine fighting continued until 1996 and began to involve violence from outside the family until the early 2000s. Merlino subsequently took control of the family and has allegedly been running the family to varying degrees ever since. Inevitably, the Philadelphia family has been weakened over the past thirty years due to internal violence, government turncoats, and law enforcement action following the passage of the RICO Act. Despite this, the family still remains one of the most active and powerful Mafia groups in the country.

History

The beginning

In the early 20th century, several Italian immigrant and Italian-American South Philadelphia street gangs joined to form what would eventually become the Philadelphia crime family. Salvatore Sabella was the first leader of the group that would later bear his name.  They busied themselves with bootlegging, extortion, loansharking, and illegal gambling, and it was during the Prohibition era that Sabella and his crew were recognized as members of the wider Sicilian crime syndicate of New York and Chicago. Sabella retired in late 1931.

John Avena, Joe Dovi, and the First Philadelphia Mafia War

After Sabella's retirement, two of his top lieutenants, John Avena and Giuseppe Dovi, began a five-year war for control of the family. Avena was murdered by members of his own faction on August 17, 1936, and Joseph "Joe Bruno" Dovi became boss of the Philadelphia family.

Dovi had good connections with the Chicago Outfit and the Five Families of New York, and he expanded operations outside of South Philadelphia to the Greater Philadelphia Area, including Atlantic City and other parts of South Jersey. Narcotics, illegal gambling, loansharking, and extortion activities provided the family's income, and connections to the Genovese and Gambino crime families grew throughout the 1930s and early 1940s.

On October 22, 1946, Dovi died of natural causes at a New York City hospital, and Joseph Ida was appointed by the Commission to run the Philadelphia family and its rackets.

Influenced by Vito Genovese

Joe Ida ran the family throughout the 1940s and early 1950s. Ida and the Philadelphia organization were heavily influenced by the bosses of the Five Families, especially the Genovese crime family, which sought to control the Philadelphia crime family. Vito Genovese, an underboss at the time, assumed control of what would become the Genovese crime family in 1956 after the shooting of former boss Frank Costello, who subsequently retired due to illness. As the Philadelphia family gained more power in Atlantic City and South Jersey, it was viewed merely as a Genovese faction due to the Genoveses' substantial amount of influence over the Philadelphia family at the time. After a 1956 Commission meeting, however, the crime families of Philadelphia and Detroit, headed by Joseph Zerilli, were added to The Commission, establishing the Philadelphia crime family as its own organization independent of control by New York crime families.

Ida and his underboss Dominick Olivetto were present during the infamous 1957 Apalachin Convention with roughly 100 other top mobsters. The meeting was raided by US law enforcement, and over 60 mafiosi were arrested and indicted for association with known organized crime members. Ida was named in the indictment and fled to Sicily not long after the meeting, leaving Antonio "Mr. Migs" Pollina as acting boss in Ida's absence.

Angelo Bruno
After Ida retired in 1959, and Pollina was demoted, Angelo Bruno was appointed by the Commission to run the Philadelphia family. Bruno, the first boss of Philadelphia with a seat at the Commission, was a close ally of Carlo Gambino, solidifying his position as leader of the Philadelphia Mafia. Bruno used his contacts and his own business mind to maintain respect and power among other Mafia bosses in the country. He expanded the family's profit and operations in Atlantic City, which, due in part to its location within the Philadelphia Metro Area, had naturally become known as the Philadelphia family's turf. Bruno himself avoided the intense media and law enforcement scrutiny and kept violence down. He spent almost three years in prison for refusing to testify at a 1970 hearing on organized crime in the state of New Jersey. After his release, he spent some time in Italy before returning to the United States in 1977.

Bruno had a reputation for seeking peaceful solutions to family issues instead of violence. Bruno oversaw the family's gambling syndicate and preferred more traditional operations such as labor racketeering, loan sharking, numbers games and infiltrating legitimate business. Outside of most family issues, however, violence was still the modus operandi of the Philly Mafia; by the late 1960s, the Philadelphia crime family used violence and intimidation to control various unions in the food and service industry such as Local 54 of the Hotel Employees and Restaurant Employees Union. The crime family plundered the local's health and welfare funds and used its control to extort money from bars and restaurants. Family members owned or had a controlling interest in many restaurants, bars and social clubs throughout the Philadelphia/South Jersey area. During the early 1960s, the Philadelphia family was officially recognized as the Bruno family.

Bruno focused mostly on low risk crimes and gave his subordinates autonomy as long as he received a share of the profits. He was against any of his men getting involved in narcotics trafficking, fearing the long prison sentences that drug trafficking charges could bring. Many of his men disagreed with this decision, seeing the large profits that could be made. Some mobsters, like Harry Riccobene and Raymond Martorano, ran drug trafficking operations behind Bruno's back. His men were further angered because Bruno accepted money from John Gambino in order to let the Gambino crime family sell heroin on Philadelphia family turf in South Jersey.

Bruno also faced pressure from New York's Five Families to let them have a cut of the business in Atlantic City, a Philadelphia Mafia-controlled city that was at the time transitioning from a city in decline to a gambling mecca. Following its early 20th-century heyday as a respected resort town, Atlantic City had been suffering from  a sharp decline in the decades prior to the 1970s. With the introduction of legalized casino gambling, Atlantic City once again became particularly desired turf for organized crime. However, Atlantic City had long been reckoned as a fief of the Philadelphia family. Under longstanding Mafia rules, the Five Families could only come into Atlantic City with the Philadelphia family's permission–something Bruno was unwilling to give.

On October 15, 1976, Carlo Gambino died of a heart attack. With Gambino gone, Bruno lost his most important ally in the underworld. Many of Bruno's subordinates felt that they were missing out on money because of Bruno's old-fashioned and content ways. His consigliere Antonio Caponigro approached Genovese family boss Frank Tieri in order to seek the Commission's permission to kill Bruno and take over the crime family. Tieri, sensing an opportunity to take Caponigro's North Jersey gambling operation and set up operations in Atlantic City, lied to Caponigro and told him he had the Commission's support. On March 21, 1980, Bruno was shot in the back of the head while in his car in South Philadelphia by a gunman working for Caponigro. That April, Caponigro visited New York City under the assumption that he was going to be confirmed as boss. Instead, he was tortured and murdered for killing a Commission member without permission. Caponigro's co-conspirators Frank Sindone, Alfred Salerno, and John Simone were also murdered for killing a mob boss without the permission of the Commission.

Second Philadelphia Mafia War (1980–84)
Beginning with Bruno's murder in 1980, a violent struggle for power erupted within the Philadelphia Mafia. Bruno's successor, his former underboss Philip Testa, lasted just under a year as the boss of the family before he was killed by a nail bomb under his front porch on March 15, 1981. Testa's murder was orchestrated by Frank Narducci in yet another attempt to take control of the family. Afterwards, Peter Casella and Nicodemo "Little Nicky" Scarfo, the late Testa's underboss and consigliere respectively, were both vying to take over the family. Violence between the two factions ensued. Scarfo was close with Genovese family consigliere Louis "Bobby" Manna and approached the Genovese hierarchy with his suspicions that Narducci and Casella orchestrated Testa's murder. The Genovese family set up a meeting with Scarfo and Casella, where Casella confessed that Narducci killed Testa so that they could take over the family. Narducci was killed and Casella was banished from the Mob and fled to Florida, leaving Scarfo the major candidate for boss of the family. However, the war continued in spite of, or because of, Scarfo’s apparent nomination to boss.

Nicodemo Scarfo was a powerful Bruno crime family mobster who operated mostly in Atlantic City, New Jersey prior to his accession to boss. Atlantic City witnessed a boom in its economy when it enacted measures allowing casino gambling in the late 1970s. Scarfo was able to expand his power base by infiltrating the expanding construction and service industries in Atlantic City. Despite Atlantic City being turf of the Philadelphia Mafia, Scarfo let the Commission operate in Atlantic City under his discretion in return for their support for him as boss. Scarfo named Salvatore "Chuckie" Merlino as his underboss and Frank Monte as his consigliere. Scarfo demoted Bruno's mob captains and replaced them with Phil Leonetti, Lawrence "Yogi" Merlino and Joseph "Chickie" Ciancaglini Sr., leading to further Mafia warring from disgruntled soldiers who were formerly well-situated under Bruno and Testa's reign but passed over by Scarfo, as well as from Philly Mafia soldiers in South Jersey who were angry that Scarfo was allowing New York gangsters to operate in Atlantic City. Scarfo eventually emerged triumphant despite considerable violent opposition and multiple murders.

The last person to stand in Scarfo's way was the well-respected, long-time Philadelphia crime family mobster and made man, Harry Riccobene. Believing that Scarfo was an unfit and greedy boss, Riccobene refused to pay his tribute to Scarfo. While Angelo Bruno apparently never asked Riccobene for a regular or unreasonable share of his illicit profits, Scarfo demanded a typical "kick up" tribute, which angered Riccobene, as he did not view Scarfo as a legitimate or appropriate successor to the position of boss. With Scarfo off the street serving a brief prison term in Texas, the "Riccobene War" ensued between 1982 and 1984 as part of the larger Second Philadelphia Mafia War in the 1980s. The Scarfo faction was able to kill three of Riccobene's men. The Riccobene faction was able to kill Scarfo's consigliere Frank Monte, while Riccobene himself survived two attempts on his life. In 1984, the two gunmen in the Monte murder, along with Riccobene's brother, were arrested and agreed to cooperate with authorities. They testified at trial that Riccobene ordered Monte's murder. Riccobene was convicted and sentenced to life in prison, ending the war.

"Little Nicky" Scarfo's reign (1981–1990)

When Nicodemo Scarfo became Boss, he wanted to unify organized crime in the area and dreamed of running a smooth criminal empire. He soon imposed a "street tax" on all criminal rackets in Philadelphia/South Jersey. Although financially extorting criminals is a common Mafia racket, it was a somewhat alien practice in Philadelphia. Enforced by soldiers and associates of the family, the tax was paid by criminals working independently from the Mafia, including drug dealers, bookmakers, loan sharks, pimps, and number runners operating in territory that Scarfo deemed his own were forced to pay his street tax weekly. Those who refused to pay the tax were often murdered. Loan shark, drug dealer and pawn shop owner John Calabrese was killed by Joseph Ciancaglini Sr., Tommy DelGiorno, Frank Iannarella and Pat Spirito. Frankie "Flowers" D'Alfonso was brutally beaten by Salvatore Testa and Joey Pungitore for refusing to pay the street tax. He was later murdered in 1985.

The crime family's biggest racket was the control of labor unions. During Bruno's and Scarfo's reigns, the Philadelphia crime family maintained some degree of influence over Roofers Union Local 30, Iron Workers Union Local 405, Laborers Union Local 332 and Teamsters Union Locals 107, 158, 331 and 837. The crime family used this influence to extort businesses, steal from the union treasuries and receive paychecks and benefits for little to no work.

Scarfo also got the crime family heavily involved in methamphetamine trafficking, which was the drug of choice in the Philadelphia/South Jersey area. At first, the family extorted money from local meth dealers. When Greek-American gangster Chelsais Bouras, boss of the Philadelphia Greek Mob, began intruding on the methamphetamine trade in Philadelphia and refused to pay Scarfo's street tax, Scarfo had him killed. Although the Greek Mob had long been a close ally and partner of the Philadelphia Mafia, and despite the fact that some Philadelphia Italian crime family members were themselves involved in Bouras's methamphetamine trafficking ring, the hot-headed and ruthless Scarfo decided to send a message to all local crime organizations about respecting the street tax and the primacy of the Philadelphia crime family by having Bouras killed in public. Bouras was eating dinner with his girlfriend, friends and Scarfo soldier Raymond Martorano when a hit team ambushed and killed Bouras and his girlfriend.

The Philadelphia crime family then started controlling the meth trade in the area by supplying illicit P2P (the key meth ingredient) to meth manufacturers. By controlling the supply of P2P the Philadelphia crime family was generally able to control the methamphetamine trade in the Philadelphia/South New Jersey area. Some criminals borrowed money from Mafia members to finance meth operations (and benefited from working with the Mafia instead of being extorted by them). The crime family also had some involvement in cocaine and marijuana trafficking.

Scarfo became notorious for his ruthless, paranoid nature. Scarfo demanded complete allegiance to him and ordered people murdered over signs of disrespect, insubordination or resistance. Described by a former crime family member:

Soon after his promotion to boss, the number of organized crime-related murders escalated in the 1980s. Philadelphia mobster turned government witness Nicholas Caramandi described Scarfo's violent nature in a 2001 interview:

Scarfo had recently inducted member Pasquale "Pat the Cat" Spirito murdered in 1983. During the Riccobene War, Spirito switched sides and aligned himself with Scarfo, but was killed for turning down a murder contract on Riccobene's brother. But Scarfo's downfall began on September 14, 1984, when Scarfo loyalist Salvatore Testa was murdered.  Despite Testa serving faithfully under Scarfo and committing several murders on his behalf, Scarfo granted his underboss Salvatore Merlino permission to kill Testa for breaking off his engagement with Merlino's daughter. After this, other members and families saw Scarfo as untrustworthy and paranoid. He also started to earn a negative reputation within his organisation, which led to members turning informant in the late 1980s. After Merlino's drinking problem got out of hand, Scarfo demoted him to soldier and promoted his nephew Phil Leonetti as his new underboss.

In November 1988, Scarfo and 16 of his men were convicted of racketeering, 10 murders, 5 attempted murders, extortion, gambling and narcotics trafficking. Along with Scarfo, underboss Philip Leonetti, three of the family's four capos or captains, Joseph Ciancaglini, Francis Iannarella Jr. and Santo Idone, and soldiers such as Albert Pontani, Salvatore Merlino and Charles Iannece were arrested. The prosecutions were strengthened by Mafia members Tommy DelGiorno and Nicholas "Nicky Crow" Caramandi agreeing to cooperate with law enforcement and testify at trial for the government in order to escape long prison terms and Scarfo's ruthless regime. Fifteen of the defendants received prison sentences ranging from 30 to 55 years, including Scarfo.

Leonetti was the next defector who agreed to cooperate with the FBI after being sentenced to 45 years in prison. Many more mobsters would later be sentenced to long prison terms for crimes such as racketeering, narcotics trafficking and murder. This caused the number of Mafia members in the family to dwindle in the 1990s, with fewer new guys available to replace all those being convicted of serious crimes. By 1990, 21 members were incarcerated, 11 were under indictment and six turned government witnesses. The Pennsylvania Crime Commission reported that there were only 24 members who were free and not facing criminal charges.

Stanfa's reign and the Third Philadelphia Mafia War (1990–1996)

With many of Scarfo's loyalists serving lengthy prison terms, it became clear that Scarfo would not be able to maintain control of the family from prison much longer. To avoid a total power vacuum in the Philadelphia Mafia, John Stanfa, a Sicilian-born mobster with the support and endorsement of the influential Gambino and Genovese crime families in New York, was named boss of the Philadelphia crime family in 1990. Word was sent to the imprisoned Scarfo in October 1990, with Scarfo being informed that he was no longer boss and that John Stanfa had been installed as boss, though Stanfa wasn’t officially installed as boss until 1991. The New York Mafia's intrusion in Philadelphia Mafia affairs was not well received by many of the younger Philadelphia-born mobsters in the Philadelphia crime family, including Joseph "Skinny Joey" Merlino, the son of former underboss Salvatore Merlino, who saw Stanfa as an outsider who had not worked his way up in the organization due to being imprisoned during the entire Scarfo era.

While serving prison time together in 1990, Merlino met Ralph Natale. According to Natale, he and Merlino began plotting to take over the Philadelphia crime family during this period. Natale named Michael Ciancaglini, Steven Mazzone, George Borgesi, Gaetano "Tommy Horsehead" Scafidi and Martin Angelina as Merlino's key associates and co-conspirators in the plan. Stanfa was aware of the divide in his family and tried to find a peaceful solution. He named Michael's older brother Joseph Jr., as his new underboss. Stanfa hoped that this would appease the Merlino faction and bring them under his banner. However, tensions escalated and in 1991 another war for control of the Philadelphia crime family was underway. Merlino loyalists shot and incapacitated Joseph Ciancaglini Jr. while Stanfa's faction killed Michael Ciancaglini. They continued attacking each other for months, including a freeway ambush Stanfa survived, and several failed attempts on Merlino's life. The Stanfa faction was still solidifying its control of the crime family and recruited many outside hitmen for the war.

On March 17, 1994, Stanfa and 23 of his men were arrested on racketeering related chargers. This was the second major indictment on the crime family in seven years. The Federal case was the largest prosecution of an organized crime group in Philadelphia history. A key piece of evidence was two years of recorded conversations Stanfa would have with mobsters in his attorney's office and doctor's office. Believing attorney–client privilege and doctor-patient confidentiality would protect him, Stanfa openly talked about important Mafia business with his men. However, the FBI was able to get a warrant to place covert listening devices in both offices once they figured out they were being used to aid criminal conspiracies. Stanfa, in an unusual tactic, recruited several men who were not of Italian heritage, including the Veasey brothers. According to the former executive director of the Pennsylvania Crime Commission, Frederick T. Martens, "Stanfa brought in people, like the Veasey brothers, who had no background in the mob but who were willing to break legs and pull a trigger". John Veasey, who pleaded guilty to charges of racketeering and murder, entered the witness protection program in 1994. William Veasey, John Veasey's brother, was murdered on October 5, 1995, the same day he was scheduled to testify against Stanfa at trial. 

Stanfa was convicted in 1995, and sentenced to life imprisonment in 1996. With most of Stanfa's supporters also arrested and convicted, Merlino was released from prison in November 1994 and named Natale, who had also been released from prison on parole, as the new boss. Merlino positioned himself as Natale's underboss. During Natale's reign, Merlino was the real power in the family, allowing Natale to become boss to direct law enforcement attention away from himself.

Natale's "front boss" reign, Natale turns informant, Merlino takes over, and continuing Mafia violence

Merlino gained notoriety as a flamboyant, celebrity gangster who often went out partying with a large entourage. The press dubbed him the John Gotti of Passyunk Avenue due to his candid demeanor in front of news cameras (Passyunk Avenue being a street in South Philadelphia). He also invited the press when he held Christmas parties for the homeless and gave away turkeys at Thanksgiving in housing projects.

The arrogance and aggressiveness of Merlino's young faction turned off a lot of criminals from working with the crime family. Merlino would often make big bets with bookies and refuse to pay when he lost. This practice, known as guzzling, was used on both independent and mob run bookies. During this time, Merlino and Natale oversaw the crime family's gambling, loan sharking, extortion and stolen goods rackets.

In 1995, Louis Turra, leader of the Philadelphia drug gang the 10th and Oregon crew (also known as the 10th and O gang), was severely beaten by Merlino's men, allegedly for failing to pay a Mafia street tax on the gang's illegal earnings. Angered by the beating, Turra sought vengeance. His father Anthony hosted a meeting at his house during which Anthony, Louis and his gang discussed killing Merlino. In January 1998, Louis Turra apparently hanged himself in a New York City jail while awaiting trial. In March 1998, Anthony Turra, on trial on charges of plotting to kill Merlino, was shot dead outside his home by a gunman in a black ski mask. He was shot twice as he left for the federal courthouse, where a jury was deliberating in the racketeering and drug case against him and four other men. "We consider this an organized crime assassination, a mob hit," Police Inspector Jerrold Kane said. Three years later, Merlino was put on trial for helping orchestrate the murder, but was acquitted.

By the late 1990s, Merlino dodged more than two dozen attempts on his life. Merlino was friends with Steve "Gorilla" Mondevergine, president of the Pagans MC motorcycle club. Merlino sometimes used the Pagans to help settle underworld disputes. During the 1990s, Merlino was also aligned with members of the Junior Black Mafia.

In June 1998, Natale was jailed for a parole violation; Merlino subsequently took control of the family and cut off support to the imprisoned boss. Angered by this, Natale offered to secretly record conversations with Merlino, but it was not until September 1999, when he was indicted for financing drug deals, that he formally struck a deal to cooperate. In doing so, Natale became the first sitting boss in the history of the American Mafia to become government informant.

Between 1999 and 2001, Merlino, along with his underboss Stephen Mazzone, his consigliere George Borgesi, Martin Angelina, John Ciancaglini and others were arrested and put on trial for racketeering, illegal gambling, loan sharking, extortion, murder and attempted murder. Natale testified against Merlino during his 2001 racketeering trial, but was unable to secure a conviction for the murders he claimed Merlino committed. On December 3, 2001, Merlino was however convicted of racketeering charges and given a 14-year prison sentence. Natale had admitted to committing eight murders and four attempted murders. In 2005, Natale was sentenced to 13 years imprisonment for drug dealing, racketeering and bribery. He was released in May 2011, and placed in witness protection.

The rise of Ligambi
In 1997, Joseph Ligambi was released from prison after he successfully appealed his murder conviction and was acquitted at retrial. After 10 years in prison, Ligambi returned to a much different Mafia family that saw two violent regime changes and the family under the control of a group of young mobsters. Ligambi, who is Borgesi's uncle, was a Scarfo era soldier when he was imprisoned in 1987 and was also mentored by Merlino's father, Salvatore. After the arrest of Merlino, Borgesi and several others in 1999, Ligambi was chosen to take over as acting boss of the family. In 2001, Merlino was sentenced to 14 years in prison. After Ligambi took over, he remained in the shadows, rarely being mentioned in the media, while taking a much less "trigger-happy" approach to running the family.

Ligambi stabilized the family when he took over, maintained membership and restored relations with the New York families. His inner circle included longtime Philadelphia mobsters Joseph "Mousie" Massimino, Gateon Lucibello, and Anthony Staino.

Ligambi was left to deal with the damage Merlino had done to the family's relationship with illegal bookmakers, who refused to do business with the Philadelphia crime family because Merlino use to make huge bets, then never paid when he lost. By the mid-2000s, the family consisted of approximately 50 members, half of whom were incarcerated, in addition to almost 100 associates. During Ligambi's tenure, around a dozen made men were released from prison, filling the ranks. Many of these men had been young players who fell victim to the family's unstable history and are now middle-aged. He named Anthony Staino, his closest and most loyal associate, as his underboss. Under Ligambi's direction, the family was able to muscle in on several video poker gambling machine businesses in the Philadelphia area. In 2007, 23 people, including four members of the Philadelphia crime family, were charged with running an illegal sports betting operation out of a poker room at the Borgata Casino in Atlantic City. The illegal operation was  ran by the Philadelphia crime family, who received much of the profits. The operation was accused of taking in $60 million in bets in a 20-month period. Most of those involved pleaded guilty and received sentences ranging from probation to five years.

Merlino was released from prison on March 15, 2011, and served out his three-year parole in Florida. In May 2011, Ligambi and 14 other members and associates of the crime family were indicted by the FBI on racketeering charges related to illegal gambling operations, video poker gambling machines and loan sharking. Seven of those indicted pleaded guilty to lesser charges. One became a government witness and seven went to trial in October 2012. In January 2014, two juries were hung on the racketeering charges, and Ligambi and Borgesi were acquitted and released.

Current status
Since Merlino's release from prison in 2011, the FBI and organized crime reporters believe he continues to run the Philadelphia-South Jersey Mafia. Merlino disputes this, claiming he retired from a life of crime. As of 2015, Merlino divides his time between south Florida and Philadelphia.

While the family's criminal operations have greatly reduced over the years, experts believe they have been able to quietly maintain power and stability, and the family remains one of the most active and powerful Italian-American Mafia families. In 2016, it was reported that some members were involved in Philadelphia's booming construction and home rehab industry. In January 2018, Merlino went on trial for racketeering, fraud and illegal gambling charges. After a trial ended in a hung jury, Merlino pleaded guilty to one illegal gambling charge and was sentenced to two years in prison.

In April 2018, four soldiers and associates in New Jersey were arrested on drug trafficking charges. They are accused of distributing large amounts of methamphetamine, heroin, fentanyl and marijuana. They eventually pleaded guilty and were given sentences between five and 15 years. 

On November 23, 2020, 15 members and associates of the crime family were indicted on federal racketeering charges; among the defendants were reputed underboss Steven Mazzone and reputed capo Domenic Grande. The primary charges are loansharking, drug trafficking, and extorting illegal sports betting operators. After previously pleading guilty, underboss Steven Mazzone was sentenced to five years in prison on December 15, 2022.

Historical leadership

Boss (official and acting)
1920–1931 — Salvatore Sabella — retired, deceased in 1962
1931–1936 — John "Nazzone" Avena — murdered on August 17, 1936
1936–1946 — Giuseppe "Joseph Bruno" Dovi
1946–1959 — Giuseppe "Joseph" Ida — deported in 1958, deceased in 1960s–1970s
1958–1959 — Antonio "Mr. Miggs" Pollina — removed by the Commission
1959–1980 — Angelo "The Gentle Don" Bruno — murdered on March 21, 1980
1980–1981 — Philip "the Chicken Man" Testa — murdered on March 15, 1981
1981–1990 — Nicodemo "Little Nicky" Scarfo Sr. — removed by the Commission, deceased in 2017
Acting 1981–1984 — Salvatore "Chuckie" Merlino
Acting 1989–1990 — Anthony "Tony Buck" Piccolo – stepped down
1990–1995 — Giovanni "John" Stanfa — imprisoned for life
1995–1999 — Ralph Natale — mostly a front boss, arrested in 1998, turned informant in 1999
 Acting 1995-1999 - Joseph "Skinny Joey" Merlino — acting/street boss
1999–present — Joseph "Skinny Joey" Merlino — arrested in 1999, released in 2011
Acting 1999–2014 — Joseph "Uncle Joe" Ligambi — indicted in May 2011, was acquitted in January 2014, stepped down and became Consigliere

Street boss
When the Boss of a family is incapacitated due to imprisonment his functions may be fulfilled by an "acting boss" or "street boss."

2011–2015 — Steven "Stevie" Mazzone — became Underboss
2015–present — Michael "Mikey Lance" Lancelotti

Underbosses (official and acting)
1911–1931 — John "Nazzone" Avena — became boss
1931–1936 — Giuseppe "Joseph Bruno" Dovi — became boss
1936–1946 — Giuseppe "Joseph" Ida — became boss
1946–1956 — Marco "Small Man" Reginelli
1956–1957 — Dominick Olivetto — retired
1957–1959 — Antonio "Mr. Miggs" Pollina — deposed by Commission
1959–1970 — Ignazio "Natz" Denaro
1970–1980 — Philip "the Chicken Man" Testa — became boss
1980–1981 — Peter "Petey" Casella — deposed by Commission
1981–1986 — Salvatore "Chuckie" Merlino — demoted, deceased in 2012
Acting 1982–1984 — Salvatore "Salvie" Testa — murdered on September 14, 1984
1986–1989 — Philip "Crazy Phil" Leonetti — turned informant
1989–1990 — Pasquale "Patty Specs" Martirano — died 
1992 — Joseph "Joey Chang" Ciancaglini Jr. — shot and incapacitated
1992–1995 — Frank Martines
1995–1999 — Joseph "Skinny Joey" Merlino — became official boss
1999–2004 — Steven Mazzone — imprisoned in 2000
2004–2012 — Joseph "Mousie" Massimino — imprisoned June 2004 – 2010
Acting 2007–2010 — Martin "Marty" Angelina
Acting 2010–2011 — Anthony Staino
2012–2015 — John "Johnny Chang" Ciancaglini — stepped down
2015–present — Steven "Stevie" Mazzone — indicted on November 23, 2020, sentenced on December 15, 2022 
Acting 2020–present – ?

Consigliere (official and acting)
1911–1931 — Giuseppe "Joseph Bruno" Dovi — became underboss
1931–1936 — Giuseppe "Joseph" Ida — became underboss
1936–1946 — Marco "Small Man" Reginelli — became underboss
1946–1977 — Giuseppe "Joe the Boss" Rugnetta
1977–1980 — Antonio "Tony Bananas" Caponigro — murdered by Commission
1980–1981 — Nicodemo "Little Nicky" Scarfo Sr. — became boss
1981–1982 — Frank Monte — murdered
1982–1989 — Nicholas Piccolo
Acting 1984–1987 — Anthony Piccolo
1989–1994 — Anthony Piccolo — imprisoned for life, deceased in 2004
1995–1996 — Ronald "Ronnie" Turchi — demoted, murdered in 1999
1996–1999 — Steven "Handsome Stevie" Mazzone — promoted to underboss
1999–2014 — George Borgesi — imprisoned in 2000, released 2014
Acting 2004–2012 — Gaeton "Gate" Lucibello — indicted 2012
2014–present — Joseph "Uncle Joe" Ligambi

Current leaders and membership
Boss – Joseph "Skinny Joey" Merlino – became boss in 1999, and is believed to still be the boss of the Philadelphia crime family.
Street Boss – Michael "Mikey Lance" Lancelotti – longtime member of the Philadelphia family. Lancelotti's position was confirmed on November 18, 2020, when the Department of Justice provided the initials "M.L." as the current street boss for the Philadelphia crime family.
Underboss – Steven "Stevie" Mazzone – the underboss according to the United States Department of Justice. On November 23, 2020, Mazzone was indicted along with capo Dominick Grande, his brother soldier Salvatore Mazzone and others on racketeering and gambling charges. On December 15, 2022, Mazzone was sentenced to serve five years in prison. He is scheduled to be released from federal custody on March 17, 2027.
Acting Underboss – Unknown
Consigliere – Joseph "Uncle Joe" Ligambi – served as longtime acting boss for boss Joey Merlino. Ligambi's position was confirmed on November 18, 2020, when the Department of Justice provided the initials "J.L." as the current consigliere for the Philadelphia crime family.

Philadelphia faction
Captain  – Domenic "Dom" Grande – a captain operating from South Philadelphia, southern New Jersey and Atlantic City according to the United States Department of Justice. In November 2020, Grande was indicted along with Underboss Steve Mazzone, soldier Salvatore Mazzone and others on racketeering and gambling charges.
Captain – George Borgesi – Philadelphia captain and nephew of consigliere Joseph Ligambi, who served as consigliere himself according to the United States Department of Justice. On July 3, 2012, before his scheduled to be released from prison Borgesi was charged with overseeing a loan sharking operation in Delaware County from his prison cell in North Carolina. He has a couple of other family members working as associates for the Philadelphia crime family. On January 24, 2014, Borgesi was released from prison. Since his release from prison Borgesi has traveled to Rhode Island forming an alliance with Patriarca crime family underboss Matthew Guglielmetti.
Soldier – Martin "Marty" Angelina – he was convicted of racketeering with Joey Merlino in 2001, and was sentenced to 78 months. In September 2012, he was sentenced to 57 months on racketeering, loansharking and illegal gambling charges.
Soldier – Gaeton "Gate" Lucibello – also known as "The Big Guy"; former capo and acting consigliere. Lucibello was originally a Stanfa loyalist before defecting to the Merlino faction during the war in the 1990s. According to government witness Rosario Bellochi, Lucibello acted as the getaway driver on the attempted murder of former Stanfa soldier Biagio Adornetto at La Veranda Restaurant on December 30, 1992. He was indicted along with Stanfa and 21 others on March 17, 1994 on racketeering and attempted murder charges. Lucibello testified in his own defense on April 25, 1996, and became the only defendant in the Stanfa case to be acquitted on May 15, 1996.
Soldier – Salvatore "Sonny" Mazzone – brother of Philadelphia underboss Steve Mazzone. In November 2020, Mazzone was indicted along with his brother Underboss Steve Mazzone, capo Dominick Grande and others on racketeering and gambling charges.
Soldier – Anthony Nicodemo – was charged with the 2012 murder of Gino DiPietro, and was a suspect in 2003 when John Casasanto was gunned down. After being on trial for the DiPietro murder, a mistrial was declared in 2014.
Soldier – Joseph Massimino – former underboss according to the United States Department of Justice. In 2004, he pleaded guilty to charges of racketeering related to gambling and loan sharking, and was sentenced to 10 years in prison.  In 2012, he was charged with additional charges of racketeering related to electronic gambling devices.

South New Jersey faction
Captain – Anthony Staino – a captain according to the United States Department of Justice. He was charged with loansharking when Henry Scipione, a Philadelphia bookie who owed Staino $80,000, testified against Staino saying that he had threatened to put a bullet in his head.
Soldier – Anthony Borgesi – was charged along with Philip Ligambi, in 1994, for the assault on a mother and her 16-year-old son over a business deal.

North New Jersey faction
Captain – Joseph "Scoops" Licata – captain of Philadelphia's North Jersey crew operating from Newark according to the United States Department of Justice. In 1994, he was sentenced to 14 years in prison after George Fresolone recorded secret conversations, and he was charged under major gambling operations in Newark. In 2013, a mistrial was declared, and Licata was acquitted of racketeering.
Soldier – Louis "Big Lou" Fazzini – soldier under Licata according to the United States Department of Justice.
Soldier – Vincent "Beeps" Centorino – he and other high-profile Philadelphia crime family mobsters, including Nicky Scarfo Jr., were tapped by the FBI, and all pleaded guilty in 1994.

Former members of the Philadelphia crime family
Vincent "Al Pajamas" Pagano: During the Merlino-Stanfa war, Pagano was a Caporegime under John Stanfa. In January 1994, Pagano along with Frank Martines, was involved with the botched murder on FBI witness John Veasey. Veasey testified against Pagano and he was found guilty of racketeering in 1995 and was sentenced to life imprisonment. In February 2019, Pagano died of natural causes at the age of 89.
Joseph "Joe Crutch" Curro: Curro first became noticed by law enforcement in 1976 overheard on a wiretap at the restaurant of caporegime Frank Sindone. He died of cancer in 2004.

Incomplete list of the currently known or suspected murdered victims

Government informants and witnesses

 Ron Previte – former capo. Previte was a Philadelphia Police Department officer for over a decade and was forced to resign around 1979. He became a bouncer in an Atlantic City casino shortly after. In 1985, he was arrested on theft charges and agreed to become an informer for the New Jersey state police. By 1993, he was a soldier in John Stanfa's Philadelphia crime family, and although he wasn't formally inducted, Stanfa allegedly told Previte to consider himself as a made man. He became an informer in 1997 and agreed to wear a wire for the FBI, he was also paid over $700,000 for information during his time as an informant. His cooperation, in part, led to former boss Ralph Natale's decision to cooperate in 1999. His testimony and cooperation has brought down at least 50 Philadelphia crime family members and associates. He died in August 2017 at the age of 73.
 Andrew Thomas DelGiorno – former captain. DelGiorno first became active with the Philadelphia crime family around 1964 and had gotten involved in the bookmaking business. He admitted to his participation in 5 murders during the 1980s. He testified against boss Nicky Scarfo and 16 other Philadelphia mobsters in November 1988.
 Nicholas "Nicky Crow" Caramandi – former hitman and soldier. In 1986, Caramandi alongside Robert Rego and former Democratic-Pennsylvania House of Representatives member, Leland Beloff, attempted to extort $1 million from real estate developer Willard Rouse, for funding revolved around the construction of Penn's Landing in Philadelphia. As a result of the 1984 slaying of Philadelphia captain Salvatore Testa, Caramandi, Joseph Grande and Charles Iannece were inducted into the Philadelphia family. After he received a message from Philadelphia crime family member Raymond Martorano while in prison, who alleged boss Nicky Scarfo was planning to have him murdered, and facing over 20 years in prison, Caramandi agreed to become a government witness.
 Eugene "Gino" Milano – former soldier and hitman. In 1981, he and captain Salvatore Testa allegedly beat up Frank D'Alfonso, on orders of Scarfo. In January 1988, he was indicted on murder, attempted murder, extortion, gambling and conspiracy to distribute narcotic charges, alongside boss Nicky Scarfo and 18 others. Milano became a government witness in early 1989 and admitted to participation in the murder of Frank D'Alfonso on July 23, 1985. It is noted that he has testified against his younger brother. In 1990, he was sentenced to 15 years in prison, however in 1993, his sentence was reduced to 9-years imprisonment.
 Lawerence "Yogi" Merlino – former captain. He is the deceased uncle of current Philadelphia family boss Joey Merlino and the brother to Chuckie Merlino. Due to his ownership of a construction company based in Atlantic City, Merlino relatives have been repeatedly denied a gaming license by the New Jersey Casino Control Commission since 1989. In 1989, he agreed to become an informer and pleaded guilty to federal racketeering charges and to a murder charge. He died in 2001.
 Phil "Crazy Phil" Leonetti – former underboss and nephew of former Philadelphia crime family boss Nicky Scarfo. He participated in his first murder at the age of 10 and helped Scarfo dispose of a corpse, a man Scarfo killed with an ice pick in a New Jersey bar for disrespecting him, the young Leonetti was used as a decoy. The first person he killed was a drug user named Louie DeMarco in 1976 on orders of boss Angelo Bruno. In 1978, he shot Vincent Falcone twice and killed him, which prompted associate Joe Salerno to become a government witness. He was inducted into the Philadelphia mob as a soldier in 1980. Leonetti was sentenced to 45 years in prison in 1987. He decided to become a government witness in 1989. Leonetti admitted to being the trigger man in 2 murders and participated in 8 separate murders. He was scheduled to testify against Gambino crime family boss John Gotti on January 21, 1992, however Gambino underboss Sammy "the Bull" Gravano agreed to testify instead. In May 1992, former federal judge Franklin Van Antwerpen reduced Leonetti's sentence to 6-years imprisonment. He testified against Genovese crime family boss Vincent Gigante in 1997 and claimed Gigante ordered 6 murder contracts as retaliation for murdering Philadelphia bosses Angelo Bruno and Phil Testa without approval from the other crime families, specifically in New York. He released a book about his life in 2012.
 George Fresolone – former soldier. During his imprisonment for illegal gambling and loansharking, Fresolone became an informant for the New Jersey State police in 1988. He recorded more than 400 conversations and his information was responsible for the indictment of nearly 40 mobsters. He wore a wire during his ceremony in July 1990 to become an official member of the Philadelphia mob. He died in 2002.
 Salvatore "Wayne" Grande – former soldier. On September 14, 1984, he shot and killed captain Salvatore Testa, the son of Phil Testa, who became boss of the Philadelphia mob for a brief period and who also inducted Grande four years earlier. According to former Philadelphia crime family underboss and government witness Phil Leonetti, Grande repeatedly attempted to murder Harry Riccobene but failed, an enemy of the Scarfo faction, including an incident where Riccobene managed to survive 5 gunshot wounds to his face. In 1988, he was convicted on federal racketeering charges and informed on American Mafia mobsters later on during his imprisonment. Some of his relatives remain in the mob, including his son, who was allegedly inducted in 2011.
 John Veasey – former associate and hitman. He was part of the Stanfa faction during the Philadelphia mob war from 1992 to 1994. In August 1993, Veasey shot and killed Michael "Mikey Chang" Ciancaglini during a drive-by shooting, and wounded Joey Merlino with 4 gunshot wounds. In September 1993, he shot and killed Frank Baldino Sr. outside of the Melrose Diner in South Philadelphia. He alleged that Stanfa became withdrawn after Veasey's complaints and ordered a contract on him. On January 14, 1994, he was lured to a second-floor apartment and noted that the room was covered in plastic, the hitmen alleged that they were "painting". Moments after, he was shot 3 times in the head and once in the chest. Veasey managed to stab one of the attackers and hit the other one, eventually fleeing the apartment. In January 1994, he became a government witness. On the day of John Stanfa's trial in October 1995 which Veasey was scheduled to testify at, his brother, William "Bill" Veasey, was murdered. He was sent to prison in the mid-1990s and was released in 2005. He released a book about his life in January 2012.
 Rosario Conti Bellocchi – former soldier and hitman. He was engaged to John Stanfa's niece. Along with fellow Philadelphia mob soldier, Biagio Adornetto, he departed Sicily to work for Stanfa.
 Biagio Adornetto – former soldier. He survived a failed assassination attempt on his life as friend and fellow Philly mob soldier, Rosario Bellocchi, loaded the shotgun with the wrong size of bullets; Adornetto was accused of flirting with John Stanfa's niece.
 Philip Colletti – former soldier. He was part of the Stanfa faction. According to Colletti, he created a remote-control bomb which was planted under Joey Merlino's car in 1993 and failed to detonate multiple times. His wife testified that Colletti and his wife participated in the disposing of a car which was used in a mob hit, the death of Michael Ciancaglini and wounding of Merlino, and fellow Philadelphia mob member and informer John Veasey testified that Colletti was with him when the shooting took place.
 Ralph Natale – former boss between 1994 and 1998. Natale was inducted by Joey Merlino while in prison in 1994 however he later claimed that he became a member under Angelo Bruno. He reached out to the FBI in the summer of 1998 while imprisoned on parole violations however a deal was worked out in 1999 after facing a charge of conspiracy to manufacture and distribute methamphetamine's in Philadelphia and New Jersey, alongside Joey Merlino. In 2000, he pleaded guilty to illegal gambling, extortion and drug distribution charges, including participating in 7 murders. He also admitted to handing bribes of around $50,000 to Milton Milan, the Democratic 45th mayor of Camden, New Jersey. He was interviewed by Trevor McDonald in 2015 and released a book about his mob life in 2017.
 Robert "Boston Bob" Luisi Jr. – former captain under Joey Merlino. Originally an associate of the Patriarca crime family, he joined the Philadelphia mob and became inducted in 1998. On November 6, 1995, his father, cousin, brother and family friend were killed by gunman Anthony Clemente who fired 13 shots inside of a Charlestown restaurant. It is noted that he attempted to seize control of the criminal rackets of Whitey Bulger in Boston during the 1990s, and attempted to meet Kevin Weeks in 1998. He was indicted by the FBI on June 28, 1999, alongside 13 others for conspiracy to acquire and distribute cocaine. In 2000, he admitted to the murder of Anthony DiPrizio in 1997. He later became a pastor and relocated in Tennessee using the alias Alonso Esposito.
 Peter "Pete the Crumb" Caprio – former capo. In July 2000, he admitted to conspiring to commit murder, extortion and other crimes. During the case, he was accused of participating in the murder of William Gantz in 1994 and Joseph Sodano in 1996. Caprio testified against the absent Genovese crime family captain Lawrence Ricci in October 2005, who was murdered a few weeks before his trial.
 Gaetano "Tommy Horsehead" Scafidi – former soldier. By 1986, he was a money runner for boss Nicky Scarfo, collecting and delivering money payments each week on behalf of Scarfo. His brother, Tori Scafidi, was also a soldier in the Philly crime family and was inducted in 1986. He joined the Merlino faction during the Philadelphia mob war in the 1990s, who opposed new boss John Stanfa. However he switched sides and was shortly after inducted into the crime family by Stanfa. In 1993, two gunmen attempted to kill him however the bullet shattered his car mirror. He became an informer in 2000.

See also
Frank Palumbo
Italian Market, Philadelphia
South Philadelphia

References

Further reading

Anastasia, George. Blood and Honor: Inside the Scarfo Mob, the Mafia's Most Violent Family. 2004, 
Anastasia, George. Goodfella Tapes.
Anastasia, George. The Last Gangster.
Wagman, Robert J. Blood Oath.
Morello, Celeste Anne. Book One Before Bruno: The History of the Mafia and La Cosa Nostra in Philadelphia. Publication date: Apr 28, 2000, 
Morello, Celeste Anne. Book Two Before Bruno: The History of the Philadelphia Mafia, 1931-1946. Publication date: Nov 28, 2001, 
Morello, Celeste Anne. Book Three Before Bruno and How He Became Boss: The History of the Philadelphia Mafia, Book 3—1946–1959.  Publication date: Aug 28, 2005,

External links
"Hitting the Hit Men Even alleged killers can be beaten up by a gang of thugs" by Brendan McGarvey 
IPSN: The Philadelphia/Atlantic City Mob 

    

 
Organizations established in 1911
1911 establishments in Pennsylvania
Organizations based in Philadelphia
Italian-American crime families
Gangs in Florida
Gangs in Philadelphia
Gangs in New Jersey
Italian-American culture in Philadelphia